Saint Eusebius may refer to:

 Pope Eusebius, Pope 309–310.
 Eusebius of Cremona (died )
 Eusebius of Fano (died )
 Eusebius of Gaza (died )
 Eusebius of Rome (died ),  priest and martyr
 Eusebius of Samosata (died ), bishop of Samosata
 Eusebius of Vercelli (–381), bishop of Vercelli